Fereydun (also Romanized as Fereydūn, Farīdūn, and Fereidoon) is a village in Shivanat Rural District, Afshar District, Khodabandeh County, Zanjan Province, Iran. At the 2006 census, its population was 348, in 86 families.

References 

Populated places in Khodabandeh County